Robert James Bernard (February 6, 1894June 9, 1981) was an American academic administrator. He was instrumental in the founding of the Claremont Colleges, a consortium of adjacent, affiliated higher education institutions in Claremont, California, and served as its leader from 1942 to 1963.

Early life 
Bernard was born in Collinwood, Ohio, and grew up in Denver, Colorado. He briefly attended Colorado College before transferring to Pomona College when his family moved to Hollywood. He majored in English and graduated in 1917.

Career 
After graduation, he became an assistant to Pomona president James Blaisdell. When the Claremont Colleges were established in 1925, he was appointed secretary under Blaisdell. He became administrative  director in 1942; his title changed to managing director in 1944 and president in 1959.

Later life 
Bernard retired in February 1963. He was president and then executive director of the Association of California Independent Colleges and Universities between 1961 and 1967. He wrote a history of the Claremont Colleges, titled An Unfinished Dream, shortly before his death in 1981.

Legacy 
The Bernard Field Station, a biological research station owned by the Claremont Colleges, is named after him.

References

Bibliography 
 
 
 

1894 births
1981 deaths
American academic administrators
Claremont Colleges people
Pomona College alumni
People from Claremont, California
People from Denver
20th-century American academics